Fairmont Hot Springs may refer to:

 Fairmont Hot Springs, British Columbia
 Fairmont Hot Springs Airport, adjacent to the British Columbia community
 Fairmont Hot Springs, Montana, United States
 Fairmont Hot Springs Resort, resort in Fairmont Hot Springs
 Fairmont Hot Springs (thermal spring) formerly known as Gregson Hot Springs